New Plymouth is an unincorporated community in northwestern Brown Township, Vinton County, Ohio, United States.  It has a post office with the ZIP code 45654.  It is located at the intersection of State Routes 56 and 328 in the county's far northeast.

History
A post office has been in operation at New Plymouth since 1850. New Plymouth was named after Plymouth, Massachusetts, the native home of a large share of the early settlers.

Tourism 
Ravenwood Castle is a unique country inn located on Bethel Road in New Plymouth, Ohio.

References

Unincorporated communities in Ohio
Unincorporated communities in Vinton County, Ohio